Bárcena de Cicero is a municipality located in the autonomous community of Cantabria, Spain. According to the 2007 census, the city has a population of 2.546 inhabitants. Its capital is Gama.

Towns
Adal
Ambrosero
Bárcena de Cicero
Cicero
Gama (Capital)
Moncalián
Treto
Vidular

References

Municipalities in Cantabria